Gladys Foster may refer to:

Gladys Johnston née Foster (1906–1983), Canadian artist
Gladys Foster, character in Legion